Madhu Muttom is an Indian screenwriter from Kerala.

Life

His second film as a screenwriter was Manichitrathazhu (1993).  It was remade in Kannada as Apthamitra and in Tamil as Chandramukhi, and finally in Hindi as Bhool Bhulaiyaa.

Madhu Muttom is unmarried and currently lives alone in the village of Muttom at Haripad.

Madhu's first film was Kakkothikkavile Appooppan Thaadikal (1986). The film titled Bharathan is the second venture by the director Anil Das who debuted by Sargavasantham in 1995.

Filmography

References

External links 
 

Living people
Screenwriters from Kerala
1951 births
Malayalam screenwriters
People from Alappuzha district